The Konbaung dynasty (also known as Third Burmese Empire (တတိယမြန်မာနိုင်ငံတော်) and formerly known as the Alompra dynasty (အလောင်းဘုရားမင်းဆက်, Alaungphra dynasty)  was the last dynasty that ruled Burma/Myanmar from 1752 to 1885. It created the second-largest empire in Burmese history and continued the administrative reforms begun by the Toungoo dynasty, laying the foundations of the modern state of Burma. The reforms, however, proved insufficient to stem the advance of the British, who defeated the Burmese in all three Anglo-Burmese Wars over a six-decade span (1824–1885) and ended the millennium-old Burmese monarchy in 1885.

Subject to later wars and treaties with the British, the modern state of Myanmar can trace its current borders to these events.

Throughout the Konbaung dynasty, the capital was relocated several times for religious, political, and strategic reasons.

History

Establishment

The dynasty was founded by a village chief, who later became known as Alaungpaya, in 1752 to challenge the Restored Hanthawaddy Kingdom which had just toppled the Taungoo dynasty. By 1759, Alaungpaya's forces had reunited all of Burma (and Manipur) and driven out the French and the British who had provided arms to Hanthawaddy.

Alaungpaya's second son, Hsinbyushin, came to the throne after a short reign by his elder brother, Naungdawgyi (1760–1763). He continued his father's expansionist policy and finally took Ayutthaya in 1767, after seven years of fighting.

Reforms
Realising the need to modernise, the Konbaung rulers tried to enact various reforms with limited success. King Mindon with his able brother Crown Prince Kanaung established state-owned factories to produce modern weaponry and goods; in the end, these factories proved more costly than effective in staving off foreign invasion and conquest.

Mindon also tried to reduce the tax burden by lowering the heavy income tax and created a property tax, as well as duties on foreign exports. These policies had the reverse effect of increasing the tax burden, as the local elites used the opportunity to enact new taxes without lowering the old ones; they were able to do so as control from the centre was weak. In addition, the duties on foreign exports stifled the burgeoning trade and commerce.

Konbaung kings extended administrative reforms begun in the Restored Toungoo dynasty period (1599–1752), and achieved unprecedented levels of internal control and external expansion. They tightened control in the lowlands and reduced the hereditary privileges of Shan chiefs. They also instituted commercial reforms that increased government income and rendered it more predictable. Money economy continued to gain ground. In 1857, the crown inaugurated a full-fledged system of cash taxes and salaries, assisted by the country's first standardised silver coinage.

Nonetheless, the extent and pace of reforms were uneven and ultimately proved insufficient to stem the advance of British colonialism.

Relations with Siam

In 1760, Burma began a series of wars with Siam that would last well into the middle of the 19th century. By 1770, Alaungpaya's heirs had temporarily defeated Siam (1765–1767), subdued much of Laos (1765) and defeated four invasions by Qing China (1765–1769). With the Burmese preoccupied for another two decades by another impending invasion by the Chinese, the Siamese recovered their territories by 1770, and went on to capture Lan Na by 1776. Burma and Siam went to war until 1855 but after decades of war, the two countries exchanged Tenasserim (to Burma) and Lan Na (to Siam).

Relations with China

In the defence of its realm, the dynasty fought four wars successfully against the Qing dynasty of China which saw the threat of the expansion of Burmese power in the East. In 1770, despite his victory over the Chinese armies, King Hsinbyushin sued for peace with China and concluded a treaty to maintain bilateral trade with the Middle Kingdom which was very important for the dynasty at that time. The Qing dynasty then opened up its markets and restored trading with Burma in 1788 after reconciliation. Thenceforth peaceful and friendly relations prevailed between China and Burma for a long time.

Relation with Vietnam
In 1823, Burmese emissaries led by George Gibson, who was the son of an English mercenary, arrived in the Vietnamese city of Saigon. The Burmese king Bagyidaw was very keen to conquer Siam and hoped Vietnam might be a useful ally. Vietnam had then just annexed Cambodia. The Vietnamese emperor was Minh Mạng, who had just taken the throne after the death of his father, the founder of the Nguyen dynasty Gia Long. A commercial delegation from Vietnam has recently been in Burma, eager to expand the trade in birds nests (tổ yến). Bagyidaw's interest in sending a return mission however was to secure a military alliance.

Relations with the British and downfall

Faced with a powerful China and a resurgent Siam in the east, Bodawpaya acquired western kingdoms of Arakan (1784), Manipur (1814) and Assam (1817), leading to a long ill-defined border with British India.

Europeans began to set up trading posts in the Irrawaddy delta region during this period. Konbaung tried to maintain its independence by balancing between the French and the British. In the end it failed, the British severed diplomatic relations in 1811, and the dynasty fought and lost three wars against the British Empire, culminating in total annexation of Burma by the British.

The British defeated the Burmese in the First Anglo-Burmese War (1824–1826) after huge losses on both sides, both in terms of manpower and financial assets. Burma had to cede Arakan, Manipur, Assam and Tenasserim, and pay a large indemnity of one million pounds.

In 1837, King Bagyidaw's brother, Tharrawaddy, seized the throne, put Bagyidaw under house arrest and executed the chief queen Me Nu and her brother. Tharrawaddy made no attempt to improve relations with Britain.

His son Pagan, who became king in 1846, executed thousands – some sources say as many as 6,000 – of his wealthier and more influential subjects on trumped-up charges. During his reign, relations with the British became increasingly strained. In 1852, the Second Anglo-Burmese War broke out. Pagan was succeeded by his younger brother, the progressive Mindon. Mindon attempted to bring Burma into greater contact with the outside world, and hosted the Fifth Great Buddhist Synod in 1872 at Mandalay, gaining the respect of the British and the admiration of his own people.

Mindon avoided annexation in 1875 by ceding the Karenni States. He died before he could name a successor, and Thibaw, a lesser prince, was manoeuvred onto the throne by Hsinbyumashin, one of Mindon's queens, together with her daughter, Supayalat. (Rudyard Kipling mentions her as Thibaw's queen, and borrows her name, in his poem "Mandalay") The new King Thibaw proceeded, under Supayalat's direction, to massacre all likely contenders to the throne. This massacre was conducted by the queen.

The dynasty came to an end in 1885 with the forced abdication and exile of the king and the royal family to India. The British, alarmed by the consolidation of French Indochina, annexed the remainder of the country in the Third Anglo-Burmese War in 1885. The annexation was announced in the British parliament as a New Year gift to Queen Victoria on 1 January 1886.

Although the dynasty had conquered vast tracts of territory, its direct power was limited to its capital and the fertile plains of the Irrawaddy 
river valley. The Konbaung rulers enacted harsh levies and had a difficult time fighting internal rebellions. At various times, the Shan states paid tribute to the Konbaung dynasty, but unlike the Mon lands, were never directly controlled by the Burmese.

Pretenders

After the abolition of the monarchy, the title of Royal Householder of the Konbaung dynasty nominally passed to Myat Phaya Lat, Thibaw's second daughter, as the King's eldest daughter married an Indian commoner.

Thibaw's third daughter Myat Phaya Galay returned to Burma and sought the return of the throne from the British in the 1920s. Her eldest son Taw Phaya Gyi was taken by Imperial Japan during the Second World War for his potential as a puppet king. Japan's efforts failed due to Taw Phaya Gyi's distaste of the Japanese and his assassination in 1948 by Communist insurgents.

After the death of Myat Phaya Lat, her grandson-in-law Taw Phaya became the nominal Royal Householder. Taw Phaya was the son of Myat Phaya Galay, the brother of Taw Phaya Gyi and the husband of Myat Phaya Lat's granddaughter Hteik Su Gyi Phaya. 
Upon Taw Phaya's death in 2019, it is unclear who serves as the Royal Householder. Soe Win, the eldest son of Taw Phaya Gyi is assumed to be the Royal Householder as there is little public information about Taw Phaya's children.

Government
The Konbaung dynasty was an absolute monarchy. As in the rest of Southeast Asia, the traditional concept of kingship aspired to the Chakravartin (Universal Monarchs) creating their own mandala or field of power within the Jambudipa universe, along with the possession of the white elephant which allowed them to assume the title Hsinbyushin or Hsinbyumyashin (Lord of the White Elephants), played a significant role in their endeavours. Of more earthly importance was the historical threat of periodic raids and aiding of internal rebellions as well as invasion and imposition of overlordship from the neighbouring kingdoms of the Mon, Tai Shans and Manipuris.

Administrative divisions
The kingdom was divided into provinces called myo. These provinces were administered by Myosa, who were members of the royal family or the highest-ranking officials of the Hluttaw. They collected revenue for the royal government, payable to the Shwedaik (Royal Treasury) in fixed instalments and retained whatever was left over. Each myo was subdivided into districts called taik, which contained collections of villages called ywa.

The kingdom's peripheral coastal provinces (Pegu, Tenasserim, Martaban and Arakan) were administered by a Viceroy called a Myowun, who was appointed by the king and possessed civil, judicial, fiscal and military powers. Provincial councils (myoyon) consisted of myo saye (town scribes), nakhandaw (receivers of royal orders), sitke (chiefs of war), htaunghmu (jailer), ayatgaung (head of the quarter), and dagahmu (warden of the gates). Each province was divided into districts called myo, each led by a myo ok (if appointed), or by a myo thugyi (if the office was hereditary). The Viceroy of Pegu was assisted by several additional officials, including an akhunwun (revenue officer), akaukwun (customs collector), and a yewun (conservator of port).

The outlying tributary fiefdoms on the edges of the kingdom were autonomous in practice and nominally administered by the king. These included the Tai-speaking (what became the Shan States during British rule), Palaung, Kachin and Manipuri kingdoms. The tributary princes of these fiefdoms regularly pledged allegiance and offered tribute to the Konbaung kings (through rituals called gadaw pwedaw) and were accorded with royal privileges and designated sawbwa (from Shan saopha, 'lord of the sky') In particular, the families of Shan sawbwas regularly intermarried into Burmese aristocracy and had close contact with the Konbaung court.

Royal agencies
The government was centrally administered by several advisory royal agencies, following a pattern established during the Taungoo dynasty.

The Hluttaw (lit. "place of royal release," c.f. Council of State) held legislative, ministerial and judicial functions, administering the royal government as delegated by the king. Sessions at the Hluttaw were held for 6 hours daily, from 6 to 9 am, and from noon to 3 pm. Listed by rank, the Hluttaw was composed of:
 Head of the Council – the king, his heir apparent, or a high-ranking prince who presided over the Hluttaw as its nominal head.
 Wunshindaw (Prime Minister) – served as the Chief Minister of the Hluttaw, an office established during the reign of Mindon Min and most notably served by the Kinwun Mingyi U Kaung
 Four Wungyi (Minister) – jointly administered the Hluttaw's administrative portfolio and shared joint responsibility for the kingdom's administration.
 Four Wundauk (Deputy Minister) – served as deputies to the Wungyi
 Myinzugyi Wun (lit. "Minister of the Cavalry Regiments") – as the highest regular army position, oversaw the Tatmadaw.
 Athi Wun (lit. "Minister of the Athi") – responsible for allocating corvée labour resources and mobilisation of taxpaying commoners, called athi, during wartime

The Byedaik (lit. "Bachelor Chambers," with Bye stemming from Mon blai ("bachelor") served as the Privy Council by handling the court's internal affairs and also served as an interlocutor between the king and other royal agencies. The Byedaik consisted of:
 Eight Atwinwun (c.f. 'Ministers of the Interior')- communicated business affairs of the Hluttaw to the king, administered internal transactions of general affairs relating to the royal court.
 Thandawzin ("Heralds") – performed secretarial duties and attended king's audiences to note king's orders and forward them to Hluttaw for inscription.
 Simihtunhmu (lit. "Lamp Lighters") – kept a list of all persons sleeping in the palace
 Hteindeinyanhmu ("caretakers of royal appointments") – performed menial tasks such as maintaining the palace furniture, draperies and other appointments

The Shwedaik was the Royal Treasury, and as such, served as the repository of the state's precious metals and treasures. Moreover, the Shwedaik retained the state's archives and maintained various records, including detailed genealogies of hereditary officials and census reports. The Shwedaik was composed of:
 Shwedaik Wun – Chancellor of the Exchequer
 Shwedaik Saw – Governor of the Treasury
 Shwedaik Kyat – Superintendent
 Shwedaik Saye – Clerk of the Treasury
 Shwedaik Thawkaing – Keeper of the Treasury Key

Royal service

Each royal agency included a large retinue of middle and low level officials responsible for day-to-day affairs. These included the:
 Nakhandaw – charged with conveying communications to and from the King and Hluttaw. Also served as intermediary between royal agencies and between king and ministers. Collected, sorted, interpreted reports, read proclamations at official gatherings, transmitted orders to provincial councils.
 Sayedawgyi (great chief clerks) – performed executive level work and preliminary investigations for trials
 Saye (clerks)
 Ameindawgyi (writers of great orders) – prepared and issued royal orders after necessary preliminary steps had been taken.
 Athonsaye (clerks of works) – oversaw construction and repairs of all public buildings
 Ahmadawye (recorders of orders) – drafted orders and letters to be issued by Hluttaw
 Awayyauk (distant arrivals) – received and read letters coming from distance before submission to ministers
 Thandawgan – ceremonial officers who received letters on behalf of the king

and 3 classes of ceremonial officers:
 Letsaungsaye (clerks of presents) – read lists of offerings made to the King at royal functions
 Yonzaw (master of ceremonies) – arranged royal functions and audiences of the King
 Thissadawge (recorders of great oaths) – administered oaths of fealty to those entering the royal service

Royal court

Konbaung society was centred on the king, who took many wives and fathered numerous children, creating a huge extended royal family which formed the power base of the dynasty and competed over influence at the royal court. It also posed problems of succession at the same time often resulting in royal massacres.

The Lawka Byuha Kyan, also known as the Inyon Sadan, is the earliest extant work on Burmese court protocols and customs. The work was written by the Inyon Wungyi Thiri Uzana, also known as the Inyon Ywaza, during the reign of Alaungpaya, the founder of the Konbaung dynasty.

Royal court life in the Konbaung dynasty consisted of both codified rituals and ceremonies and those that were innovated with the progression of the dynasty. Many ceremonies were composed of Hindu ideas localised and adapted to existing traditions, both Burmese and Buddhist in origin. These rituals were also used to legitimise the rule of Burmese kings, as the Konbaung monarchs claimed descent from Maha Sammata through the Sakyan clan (of which Gotama Buddha was a member) and the House of Vijaya. Life in the royal court was closely regulated. Eunuchs oversaw the ladies of the royal household and apartments. Inferior queens and concubines could not reside in the main palace buildings.

Brahmins, generally known as ponna in Burmese, served as specialists for ritual ceremonies, astrology, and devotional rites to Hindu deities at the Konbaung court. They played an essential role in king-making rituals, consecration and ablution ceremonies called abhiseka. Court Brahmins (parohita) were well embedded in daily life at the court, advising and consulting the king on various matters. A social hierarchy among the Brahmins determined their respective duties and functions. Astrologer Brahmins called huya were responsible for determining astrological calculations, such as determining the auspicious moment for the foundation of a new capital, a new palace, pagoda, or assumption of the royal residence, announcing an appointment, leaving a place, visiting a pagoda or starting a military campaign. They also established the religious calendar, prepared the almanac, calculated upcoming solar and lunar eclipses, identified major festival days based on the lunar cycle, and communicated auspicious times and dates. A special group of Brahmins who performed abhiseka rituals were also selected as pyinnya shi, appointed royal counselors.

Military

Royal rituals

Lavish affairs were also organised around the life ceremonies of royal family members. Brahmins presided over many of these auspicious ceremonies, including the construction of a new royal capital; consecration of the new palace, the royal ploughing ceremony; the naming, first rice feeding and cradling ceremonies; the abhiseka head anointing rituals, and the King's participation in Burmese New Year (Thingyan) celebrations. During Thingyan, a group of 8 Brahmins sprinkled water blessed by a group of 8 Buddhist monks, throughout the palace grounds, at the Hluttaw, various courts, the major city gates, and the 4 corners of the capital. The king attended many of the ceremonies involving royal family members, from cradling ceremonies to ear-boring ceremonies, from marriages to funerals.

Specific buildings in the royal palace served as the venue for various life ceremonies. For instance, the Great Audience Hall was where young princes underwent the shinbyu coming-of-age ceremony and were ordained as monk novices. This was also the venue where young princes ceremonially had their hair tied in a topknot. Elaborate Burmese New Year feasts took place at the Hmannandawgyi (Palace of Mirrors): on the third day of the New Year, the king and chief queen partook in Thingyan rice, cooked rice dipped in cold perfumed water, while seated on their throne. Musical and dramatic performances and other feasts were also held in that complex.

Consecration ceremonies (abhiseka)

The most significant court functions of a king's reign were the abhiseka or consecratory rituals, held at various times throughout a king's reign, to reinforce his place as the patron of religion (Sasana) and righteousness. Abhiseka rituals all involved the pouring of water from a conch on the candidate's (usually the king's) head, instructing him what to do or not to do for the love of his people and warning him that if he failed to oblige, he might suffer certain miseries. Ablution rituals were the responsibility of a group of 8 elite Brahmins uniquely qualified to perform the ritual. They were to remain chaste before the ceremony. Another group of Brahmins was responsible for the consecration of the Crown Prince.

There were 14 types of abhiseka ceremonies in total:
 Rājabhiseka – coronation of the king
 Muddhabhiseka – formal vow by the king to work for the propagation of the Sasana (the Buddha's teachings); held five years after accession
 Uparājabhiseka – installation of crown prince
 Mahesībhiseka – coronation of chief queen
 Maṅgalabhiseka – held to celebrate the possession of white elephants
 Siriyabhiseka – held to renew the king's glory, held on occasion
 Āyudighabhiseka – held to gain longevity, held on occasion
 Jayabhiseka – held to ensure victory and success in war
 Mahābhiseka – held to increase economic prosperity, held seven years after accession
 Sakalabhiseka – held to ensure peace in the kingdom
 Vijayabhiseka – held to conquer enemies
 Mandabhiseka – held to marry the candidate to a queen of royal lineage.
 Singabhiseka – held to recommit a king to abide by the laws, whereupon full powers for the government and administration of the country are conferred

Coronation

Rajabhiseka – the Coronation of the king, which was presided over by Brahmins, was the most important ritual of the royal court. The ceremony was typically held in the Burmese month of Kason, but did not necessarily occur during the beginning of a reign. The Sasanalinkaya states that Bodawpaya, like his father, was crowned only after establishing control over the kingdom's administration and purifying the religious institutions. The most important features of this ritual were: the fetching of the anointing water; the ceremonial bath; the anointment; and the king's oath.

Elaborate preparations were made precisely for this ceremony. Three ceremonial pavilions (Sihasana or Lion Throne; Gajasana or Elephant Throne; and the Marasana or Peacock Throne) were constructed in a specifically designated plot of land (called the "peacock garden") for this occasion. Offerings were also made to deities and Buddhist parittas were chanted. Specially designated individuals, usually the daughters of dignitaries including merchants and Brahmins, were tasked with procuring anointing water midstream from a river. The water was placed in the respective pavilions.

At an auspicious moment, the king was dressed in the costume of a Brahma and the queen in that of a queen from devaloka. The couple was escorted to the pavilions in procession, accompanied by a white horse or a white elephant. The king first bathed his body in the Morasana pavilion, then his head in the Gajasana pavilion. He then entered the Sihasana pavilion to assume his seat at the coronation throne, crafted to resemble a blooming lotus flower, made of figwood and applied gold leaf. Brahmins handed him the five articles of coronation regalia (Min Myauk Taza):
 White umbrella (hti byu)
 Crown, in the form of a crested headdress (magaik)
 Sceptre (thanlyet)
 Sandals (che nin)
 Fly-whisk, made of yak tail (thamyi yat)

At his throne, eight princesses anointed the king by pouring specially procured water atop his head, each using a conch bedazzled with gems white solemnly adjuring him in formulae to rule justly. Brahmins then raised a white umbrella over the king's head. This anointment was repeated by eight pure-blooded Brahmins and eight merchants. Afterward, the king repeated words ascribed to Buddha at birth: "I am foremost in all the world! I am most excellent in all the world! I am peerless in all the world!" and made invocation by pouring water from a golden ewer. The ritual ended with the king taking refuge in the Three Jewels.

As part of the coronation, prisoners were released. The king and his pageant returned to the Palace, and the ceremonial pavilions were dismantled and cast into the river. Seven days after the ceremony, the king and members of the royal family made an inaugural procession, circling the city moat on a gilt state barge, amid festive music and spectators.

Installation of the Crown Prince

Uparājabhiseka – the Installation of the Uparaja (Crown Prince), in Burmese Einshe Min, was one of the most important rituals in the king's reign. The Installation Ceremony took place in the Byedaik (Privy Council). The Crown Prince was invested, received appenages and insignias, and was bestowed a multitude of gifts. The king also formally appointed a retinue of household staff to oversee the Prince's public and private affairs. Afterward, the Crown Prince was paraded to his new Palace, commiserate with his new rank. Preparations for a royal wedding with a princess, specially groomed to become the new king's consort, then commenced.

Feeding of the first betel

Kun U Khun Mingala – the Feeding of the First Betel ceremony was held about 75 days after the birth of a prince or princess to bolster the newborn child's health, prosperity and beauty. The ceremony involved the feeding of betel, mixed with camphor and other ingredients. An appointed official arranged the rituals preceding the ceremony. These rituals included a specific set of offerings to the Buddha, indigenous spirits (yokkaso, akathaso, bhummaso, etc.), Guardians of the Sasana, and to the parents and grandparents of the child, all of which were arranged in the infant's chamber. Additional offerings were made to the Hundred Phi, a group of 100 Siamese spirits headed by Nandi, personified by a Brahmin figure made of kusa grass, which was ceremonially fed scoops of cooked rice with the left hand.

Naming ceremony
Nāmakaraṇa – the naming ceremony took place 100 days after the birth of a prince or princess. Food was also offered for the dignitaries and entertainers in attendance. The infant's name was inscribed on a gold plate or on palm leaf. The night before the ceremony, a pwe was held for the attendees. The dawn of the ceremony, Buddhist monks delivered a sermon to the court. Afterward, at the Chief Queen's apartment, the infant was seated on a divan with the Chief Queen, with respective attendees from the royal court seated according to rank. A Minister of the Interior then presided over ceremonial offerings made to the Triple Gem, the 11 deva headed by Thagyamin, 9 Hindu deities, indigenous nat, and the 100 Phi. A protective prayer was then recited. After the prayer, a pyinnyashi prepared and 'fed' Nandi. At the auspicious moment calculated by astrologers, the name of the infant was read out thrice by the royal herald. Afterward, another royal herald recited an inventory of presents offered by the dignitaries in attendance. At the closing of the ceremony, a feast ensued, with attendees fed in the order of precedence. Offerings to the Buddha were shuttled to the pagodas, and those to Nandi, to the sacrificial Brahmins.

Royal Ploughing Ceremony

Lehtun Mingala – the Royal Ploughing Ceremony was an annual festival of breaking ground with ploughs in the royal fields east of the royal capital, to ensure sufficient rainfall for the year by propitiating the Moekhaung Nat, who was believed to control rain. The ceremony was traditionally linked to an event in Gotama Buddha's life. During King Suddhodana's royal ploughing of the fields, the infant Buddha rose to stand, sat cross-legged and began to meditate, underneath the shade of a rose apple tree.

The ceremony was held at the beginning of June, at the break of the southwest monsoon. For the ceremony, the king, clad in state robes (a paso with the peacock emblem (daungyut)), a long silk surcoat or tunic encrusted with jewels, a spire-like crown (tharaphu), and 24 strings of the salwe across his chest, and a gold plate or frontlet over his forehead) and his audience made a procession to the leya (royal fields). At the ledawgyi, a specially designated plot of land, milk-white oxen were attached to royal ploughs covered with gold leaf, stood ready for ploughing by ministers, princes and the kings. The oxen were decorated with gold and crimson bands, reins bedecked with rubies and diamonds, and heavy gold tassels hung from the gilded horns. The king initiated the ploughing, and shared this duty among himself, ministers and the princes. After the ceremonial ploughing of the ledawgyi was complete, festivities sprung up throughout the royal capital.

Head-washing ceremony
At Thingyan and at the end of the Buddhist lent, the king's head was ceremonially washed with water from Gaungsay Gyun (lit. Head Washing Island) between Martaban and Moulmein, near the mouth of the Salween River. After the Second Anglo-Burmese War (which resulted in Gaungsay Gyun falling under British possession), purified water from Irrawaddy River was instead procured. This ceremony also preceded the earboring, headdressing, and marriage ceremonies of the royal family.

Obeisance ceremony
The Obeisance ceremony was a grand ceremony held at the Great Audience Hall thrice a year where tributary princes and courtiers laid tribute, paid homage to their benefactor, the Konbaung king, and swore their allegiance to the monarchy. The ceremony was held 3 times a year:
 Hnit Thit Gadaw – Beginning of the Burmese New Year (April)
 Wa-win Gadaw – Beginning of the Buddhist Lent (June or July) – required the attendance of princes, ministers and city officials
 Wa-gyut Gadaw – End of the Buddhist Lent (October) – required the attendance of provincial governors and tributary princes (sawbwa)

During this ceremony, the king was seated at the Lion Throne, along with the chief queen, to his right. The Crown Prince was seated immediately before the throne in a cradle-like seat, followed by princes of the blood (min nyi min tha). Constituting the audience were courtiers and dignitaries from vassal states, who were seated according to rank, known in Burmese as Neya Nga Thwe:
 Taw Neya;
 Du Neya;
 Sani;
 Atwin Bawaw;
 Apyin Bawaw

There, the audience paid obeisance to the monarch and renewed their allegiance to the monarch. Women, barring the chief queen, were not permitted to be seen during these ceremonies. Lesser queens, ministers' wives and other officials were seated in a room behind the throne: the queens were seated in the centre within the railing surrounding the flight of steps, while the wives of ministers and others sat in the space without.

Ancestor worship
Throughout the Konbaung dynasty, the royal family performed ancestral rites to honour their immediate ancestors. These rites were performed at the thrice a year at the Zetawunsaung (Jetavana Hall or "Hall of Victory"), which housed the Goose Throne, immediately preceding the Obeisance Ceremony. On a platform in a room to the west of hall, the king and members of the royal family paid obeisance to images of monarchs and consorts of the Konbaung dynasty. Offerings and Pali prayers from a book of odes were also made to the images. Images were only made for Konbaung kings at their death (if he died on the throne) or for Konbaung queens (if she died while her consort was on throne), but not of a king who died after deposition or a queen who survived her husband. Items used by the deceased personage (e.g. sword, spear, betel box) were preserved along with the associated image. After the British conquest of Upper Burma, 11 images fell into the hands of the Superintendent at the Governor's Residence, Bengal, where they were melted down.

Funerals

When a king died, his royal white umbrella was broken and the great drum and gong at the palace's bell tower (at the eastern gate of the palace), was struck. It was custom for members of the royal family, including the king, to be cremated: their ashes were put into a velvet bag and thrown into the river. King Mindon Min was the first to break tradition; his remains were not cremated, but instead were buried intact, according to his wishes, at the place where his tomb now stands. Before his burial, the King Mindon's body was laid in state before his throne at the Hmannandawgyi (Palace of Mirrors).

Foundation sacrifice

The Foundation Sacrifice was a Burmese practice whereby human victims known as myosade were ceremonially sacrificed by burial during the foundation of a royal capital, to propitiate and appease the guardian spirits. to ensure impregnability of the capital city. The victims were crushed to death underneath a massive teak post erected near each gateway, and at the four corners of the city walls, to render the city secure and impregnable. Although this practice contradicted the fundamental tenets of Buddhism, it was in alignment with prevailing animistic beliefs, which dictated that the spirits of persons who suffered violent deaths became nats (spirits) and protective and possessive of their death sites. The preferred sites for such executions were the city's corners and the gates, the most vulnerable defence points.

The Konbaung monarchs followed ancient precedents and traditions to found the new royal city. Brahmins were tasked with planning these sacrificial ceremonies and determining the auspicious day according to astrological calculations and the signs of individuals best suited for sacrifice. Usually, victims were selected from a spectrum of social classes, or unfortuitiously apprehended against will during the day of the sacrifice. Women in the latter stages of pregnancy were preferred, as the sacrifice would yield two guardian spirits instead of one.

Such sacrifices took place at the foundation of Wunbe In Palace in Ava in 1676 and may have taken place at the foundation of Mandalay in 1857. Royal court officials at the time claimed that the tradition was dispensed altogether, with flowers and fruit offered in lieu of human victims. Burmese chronicles and contemporary records only make mention of large jars of oil buried at the identified locations, which was, by tradition, to ascertain whether the spirits would continue to protect the city (i.e., so long as the oil remained intact, the spirits were serving their duty). Shwe Yoe's The Burman describes 52 men, women and children buried, with 3 buried under the post near each of the twelve gates of the city walls, one at each corner of those walls, one at each corner of the teak stockade, one under each of the four entrances to the Palace, and four under the Lion Throne. Taw Sein Ko's Annual Report for 1902–03 for the Archaeological Survey of India mentions only four victims buried at the corners of the city walls.

Devotional rituals

Brahmins at the Konbaung court regularly performed a variety of grand devotional rituals to indigenous spirits (nat) and Hindu deities. The following were the most important devotional cults:
 Ganesha (Maha Peinne in Burmese) – During the Burmese month of Nadaw (November to December), a festival for Ganesha, the god of prudence and good policy, was held. Grain first reaped from the royal fields was sent to the Mahamuni Buddha Temple as an offering to Ganesha, in three huge containers in the shape of a buffalo, bullock and prawn, in which paddy, millet, and bulrush millet were respectively placed. Ganesha, mounted on a peacock, was placed on a ceremonial procession and was then brought before the king, who after paying homage, scattered pieces of silver and clothes among the poor. Ganesha occupied a prominent place in royal ceremonies, especially as he was considered a guardian deity of the elephants. Offerings to Ganesha, made in the Burmese month of Tazaungmon were established during Bodawpaya's reign.
 Phaya Ko Zu (lit. "Nine Deities") – This was a devotional rite performed by Khettara Brahmins. The deities referenced were either Buddhist: Buddha and the 8 arahats, or non-Buddhist: 5 Hindu deities, including Candi and Ganesha, and 4 nats).
 Skanda – King Bodawpaya reformed the annual ceremonial procession to honour Ganesha to instead honour Skanda, the god of war (and a son of Shiva and Candi), following the advice of a Brahmin from Benares. This procession was held in the Burmese month of Tabaung. Skanda was closely linked with a deity called Citrabali-mara (Cittarapali-mar[a]), both of whom were connected to rituals mentioned in Rajamattan, a standard reference for ceremonies at the royal court compiled during Bodawphaya's reign.
 Hindu deities: Candi (Canni), Indra (Thagyamin), Shiva, Vishnu, Asuras and the 4 Lokapala – These deities were placed at specific locations, at the entrances of the capital city, the royal palace, or in temples, to ward off evil.
 Other spirits (nat): Planets, Sky, Sun, Moon, Hon (the fire spirit)

Society and culture

Social classes
During the Konbaung dynasty, Burmese society was highly stratified. Loosely modelled on the four Hindu varnas, Konbaung society was divided into four general social classes by descent:
 Rulers or Khattiya
 Ritualists or Brahmana
 Merchants or Vessa
 Commoners or Tudda

Society also distinguished between the free and slaves, who were indebted persons or prisoners of war (including those brought back from military campaigns in Arakan, Ayuthaya, and Manipur), but could belong to one of the four classes. There was also distinction between taxpayers and non-taxpayers. Tax-paying commoners were called athi, whereas non-taxpaying individuals, usually affiliated to the royal court or under government service, were called ahmuhtan.

Outside of hereditary positions, there were two primary paths to influence: joining the military and joining the Buddhist Sangha in the monasteries.

Sumptuary laws
Sumptuary laws called yazagaing dictated life and consumption for Burmese subjects in the Konbaung kingdom, everything from the style of one's house to clothing suitable to one's social standing from regulations concerning funerary ceremonies and the coffin to be used to usage of various speech forms based on rank and social status. In particular, sumptuary laws in the royal capital were exceedingly strict and the most elaborate in character.

For instance, sumptuary laws forbade ordinary Burmese subjects to build houses of stone or brick and dictated the number of tiers on the ornamental spired roof (called pyatthat) allowed above one's residence— the royal palace's Great Audience Hall and the 4 main gates of the royal capital, as well as monasteries, were allowed 9 tiers while those of the most powerful tributary princes (sawbwa) were permitted 7, at most.

Sumptuary laws ordained 5 types of funerals and rites accorded to each: the king, royal family members, holders of ministerial offices, merchants and those who possessed titles, and peasants (who received no rites at death).

Sumptuary regulations regarding dress and ornamentation were carefully observed. Designs with the peacock insignia were strictly reserved for the royal family and long-tailed hip-length jackets and surcoats were reserved for officials. Velvet sandals were worn exclusively by royals. Gold anklets were worn only by the royal children.  Silk cloth, brocaded with gold and silver flowers and animal figures were only permitted to be worn by members of the royal family and ministers’ wives.  Adornment with jewels and precious stones was similarly regulated. Usage of hinthapada, a vermilion dye made from cinnabar was regulated.

Demography

Throughout the Konbaung dynasty, cultural integration continued. For the first time in history, the Burmese language and culture came to predominate the entire Irrawaddy valley, with the Mon language and ethnicity completely eclipsed by 1830. The nearer Shan principalities adopted more lowland norms.

Captives from various military campaigns in their hundreds and thousands were brought back to the kingdom and resettled as hereditary servants to royalty and nobility or dedicated to pagodas and temples; these captives added new knowledge and skills to Burmese society and enriched Burmese culture. They were encouraged to marry into the host community thus enriching the gene pool as well. Captives from Manipur formed the cavalry called Kathè myindat (Cassay Horse) and also Kathè a hmyauk tat (Cassay Artillery) in the royal Burmese army. Even captured French soldiers, led by Chevalier Milard, were forced into the Burmese army. The incorporated French troops with their guns and muskets played a key role in the later battles between the Burmese and the Mons. They became an elite corps, which was to play a role in the Burmese battles against the Siamese (attacks and capture of Ayutthaya from 1760 to 1765) and the Manchus (battles against the Chinese armies of the Qianlong Emperor from 1766 to 1769). Muslim eunuchs from Arakan also served in the Konbaung court.

A small community of foreign scholars, missionaries and merchants also lived in Konbaung society. Besides mercenaries and adventurers who had offered their services since the arrival of the Portuguese in the 16th century, a few Europeans served as ladies-in-waiting to the last queen Supayalat in Mandalay, a missionary established a school attended by Mindon's several sons including the last king Thibaw, and an Armenian had served as a king's minister at Amarapura.

Among the most visible non-Burmans of the royal court were Brahmins. They typically originated from one of four locales:
 Manipur – acquired with the conquest of Manipur; perhaps from Bengal, since Manipur was Hinduised by Bengali Brahmins in the 1700s
 Arakan – acquired with the conquest of Arakan in 1785 by King Bodawpaya's son, Thado Minsaw
 Sagaing – long-established lines of Brahmins at Burman and Mon royal courts, who traced their origins to ninth century Sri Ksetra or 14th century Sagaing
 Benares – Indian Brahmins from Benares who arrived in upper Burma between the late 1700s to early 1800s.

Literature and arts

The evolution and growth of Burmese literature and theatre continued, aided by an extremely high adult male literacy rate for the era (half of all males and 5% of females). Foreign observers such as Michael Symes remarked on widespread literacy among commoners, from peasants to watermen.

The Siamese captives carried off from Ayutthaya as part of the Burmese–Siamese War (1765–67) went on to have an outsize influence on traditional Burmese theatre and dance. In 1789, a Burmese royal commission consisting of Princes and Ministers was charged with translating Siamese and Javanese dramas from Thai to Burmese. With the help of Siamese artists captured from Ayutthaya in 1767, the commission adapted two important epics from Thai to Burmese: the Siamese Ramayana and the Enao, the Siamese version of Javanese Panji tales into Burmese Yama Zattaw and Enaung Zattaw. One classical Siamese dance, called Yodaya Aka (lit. Ayutthaya-style dance) is considered one of the most delicate of all traditional Burmese dances.

Architecture
Burmese dynasties had a long history of building regularly planned cities along the Irawaddy valley between the 14th to 19th century. Town planning in pre-modern Burma reached its climax during the Konbaung period with cities such as Mandalay. Alaungpaya directed many town planning initiatives. He built many small fortified towns with major defences. One of these, Rangoon, was founded in 1755 as a fortress and sea harbor. The city had an irregular plan with stockades made of teak logs on a ground rampart. Rangoon had six city gates with each gate flanked by massive brick towers with typical merlons with cross-shaped embrasures. The stupa of Shwedagon, Sule and Botataung were located outside the city walls. The city had main roads paved with bricks and drains along the sides.

Religion 

Monastic and lay elites around the Konbaung kings, particularly from Bodawpaya's reign, launched a major reformation of Burmese intellectual life and monastic organisation and practice known as the Sudhamma Reformation. It led to, amongst other things, Burma's first proper state histories.

Rulers

Note: Naungdawgyi was the eldest brother of Hsinbyushin and Bodawpaya who was the grandfather of Bagyidaw who was Mindon's elder uncle. They were known by these names to posterity, although the formal titles at their coronation by custom ran to some length in Pali; Mintayagyi paya (Lord Great King) was the equivalent of Your/His Majesty whereas Hpondawgyi paya (Lord Great Glory) would be used by the royal family.

Family tree

See also
 History of Burma

Citations

Notes

References

External links

 Forty Years in Burma John Ebenezer Marks, London: Hutchinson & Co., 1917
 The Last Queen of Burma Kenneth Champeon, The Irrawaddy, July 2003
 Before and after the wheel: Pre-colonial and colonial states and transportation in mainland Southeast Asia and West Africa Michael Charney, HumaNetten 37 2016.
 Ayutthaya and the End of History:Thai Views of Burma Revisted Min Zin, The Irrawaddy, August 2000
 A rare meeting with the last of Burma's royals The Daily Telegraph, 26 February 2008
 Myanmar's last royal laments a crumbling nation Reuters, 10 March 2008

 
Former countries in Burmese history
Burmese monarchy
18th century in Burma
19th century in Burma
Former monarchies of Southeast Asia
States and territories established in 1752
States and territories disestablished in 1885
1752 establishments in Asia
1885 disestablishments in Asia
1750s establishments in Burma
1880s disestablishments in Burma
Former monarchies
Former monarchies of Asia